Madis Kõiv (5 December 1929, Tartu, Estonia – 24 September 2014, Tartu, Estonia) was an Estonian writer, philosopher and physicist.

Education
Kõiv attended school in Tartu after the second World War, graduating in the early 1950s with a degree in nuclear physics. Kõiv worked as a scientist and lecturer until 1991.

Career as a playwright
Kõiv always entertained a fascination with and love for literature. He wrote mostly for personal entertainment until the 1950s, when he became active in Estonian literary circles. His earliest published works were written with friends from these circles. He also wrote under a pseudonym for several years.

His first published work was a play called Küüni täitmine (Filling the Hay Barn) written as a collaboration between Kõiv (using his pseudonym Jaanus Andreus Nooremb) and Hando Runnel in 1978.  In 1999, the play was successfully produced for the first time.

Kõiv then wrote two pieces with Vaino Vahing. The first was a play titled Faehlmann. Keskpäev. Õhtuselgus. (Faehlmann. Noon. Evening Clarity.) The two also wrote the dialogue novel Endspiel. Laskumine orgu. (Endspiel. Descent into the Valley.)

Just before the end of the decade, Kõiv began to publish works he had previously written for his own amusement under his own name. Kõiv became the most essential Estonian playwright of the 1950s and 1960s.

In the early 1990s, Kõiv began to gain fame. In 1991 and 1993, he won the Tuglas short story award for Film and The Life of an Eternal Physicus, respectively. He won the annual Estonian literary award in 1991 for The Meeting. He won the annual Estonian literary award again in 1995 for The Philosopher's Day and Return to Father. Kõiv won the award a third time in 1999 for Scenes From the Hundred Years' War.

Kõiv had released only 22 of the plays he had written and said that these comprise half of the dramatic literature he has created.

Career as a novelist
Kõiv was also the author of several novels. Widow and Aporia of Attica, Tragedy of Elea are two of his best known. In 1996 he published Aken. Kõiv wrote the novel in the 1960s, but it did not pass during the Soviet occupation of censorship.

Philosophy
Madis Kõiv was one of the many proponents of analytical philosophy in Estonia. In 1991, he became one of the initiators of the Seminar of Analytical Philosophy.

Memoirs
Kõiv's memoirs (the series Studia memoriae) consist largely of introspection, in sharp contrast to a typical biography.

References

Sources
 Estonian Literary Magazine

Estonian philosophers
1929 births
2014 deaths
Estonian dramatists and playwrights
Estonian male novelists
Recipients of the Order of the National Coat of Arms, 4th Class
Writers from Tartu
People from Tartu
20th-century Estonian physicists
University of Tartu alumni
Academic staff of the University of Tartu
Academic staff of the Tallinn University of Technology
20th-century Estonian novelists
20th-century dramatists and playwrights
Male dramatists and playwrights
21st-century Estonian novelists
21st-century dramatists and playwrights
20th-century male writers
21st-century male writers